Planning Policy Statement 7: Sustainable Development in Rural Areas commonly abbreviated as PPS 7, is a document produced by the British Government to advise Local planning authorities on policies for rural areas. The current version was introduced in August 2004 and replaced Revised PPG 7: The Countryside - Environmental Quality and Economic and Social Development (published February 1997).

See also
Planning Policy Statements
Town and country planning in the United Kingdom
Planning and Compulsory Purchase Act 2004

United Kingdom planning policy